The United States Access Board (also known as the  Architectural and Transportation Barriers Compliance Board) is an independent agency of the United States government devoted to accessibility for people with disabilities. The Board was created in 1973 to ensure access to federally funded facilities. It develops and maintains design criteria for the built environment, transit vehicles, telecommunications equipment, and electronic and information technology. It also provides technical assistance and training on these requirements and on accessible design and continues to enforce accessibility standards that cover federally funded facilities.

The Board is structured to function as a coordinating body among federal agencies and to directly represent the public, particularly people with disabilities. Half of its members are representatives from most of the federal departments. The other half are members of the public appointed by the U.S. President, a majority of whom must have a disability.

See also
Americans with Disabilities Act
 ADA Compliance Kit
 ADA Signs
 American Disability rights movement
 Convention on the Rights of Persons with Disabilities
 Developmental disability
 Individual rights advocate
 Interactive accommodation process
 Job Accommodation Network – provides information about rights and responsibilities under the ADA and related legislation
 List of anti-discrimination acts
 Disability discrimination act
 Title VII of the Civil Rights Act of 1964
 List of disability rights activists
 Stigma management
 Timeline of disability rights in the United States

References

External links
 
United States Access Board Guidelines and Standards

1973 establishments in Washington, D.C.
Accessibility
Disability law in the United States
Access Board
Government agencies established in 1973